Smyril Line is a Faroese shipping company, linking the Faroe Islands with Denmark and Iceland. It previously also served Norway and the United Kingdom.  is the Faroese word for the merlin.

History 
Since 1983, the company has operated a regular international passenger, car and freight service using a multi-purpose ferry, MS Norröna. The original vessel was a Swedish-built ferry formerly named Gustav Vasa (built in 1973). This was replaced by the Norröna, built in Lübeck, Germany in 2003. The purchase price of €100 million caused the company financial difficulties, and Smyril line eventually had to receive public support from the Faroese Government to stay afloat.

Today the holding company is owned by Framtaksgrunnur Føroya (Faroese Development Trust) 33.6%, the Faroese Government 23.6%, TF Holding 20.7% and the Shetland Development Trust 6.8%, the remaining shares are owned by several minor stakeholders.

Operations 
The weekly service serves Tórshavn in the Faroe Islands, Seyðisfjörður in Iceland, and Hirtshals in Denmark. The crossing between Hirtshals and Tórshavn takes 38 hours in winter and 30 hours during the summer schedule. The onwards journey to Seyðisfjörður takes another 15 hours. Until the end of the summer 2007 timetable, Smyril Line also served Lerwick in the Shetland Islands. On 11 November 2008 Smyril Line announced that it would end services to Scrabster, Scotland and Bergen, Norway. On 1 September Smyril Line announced that it would end services to Hanstholm (summer) and Esbjerg (winter) in Denmark and move all its Danish ferry operations to Hirtshals.

Cargo 
Smyril Line Cargo operates a fleet of four vessels: Eystnes, Hvítanes, Akranes and Mykines. Cargo is also shipped on the Norröna. Eystnes and Hvítanes connect Tórshavn, Hirsthals, Scrabster and St. Petersburg, with Akranes connecting Rotterdam with various Norwegian ports.

The MV Mykines is the newest ship of the fleet, added in April 2017. Built at the Norwegian UMOE Sterkoder shipyard in 1996, it was previously operated as Auto Baltic for Bore shipping company in Finland. It measures 138.5 metres in length and 22.6 metres in width. As a RoRo ship it also takes unaccompanied cars as freight, providing an alternative to the Norröna. It sails from Rotterdam via Tórshavn (stopping there northbound only) to Þorlákshöfn in Iceland.

See also
Transport in the Faroe Islands

References

External links
Smyril Line (official website in English)
BBC News: Cars wrecked as ferry hit storms, 13 November 2007

Ferry companies of the Faroe Islands
Ferry companies of Iceland
Ferry companies of Denmark
Organisations associated with Shetland